Cathleen Tschirch (born 23 July 1979, in Dresden) is a German sprinter who specialises in the 200 metres. Her personal best time on the individual distance is 22.97 seconds, achieved in August 2007 in Bochum. She has a personal best of 11.42 seconds in the 100 metres.

At the 2007 World Championships she finished seventh in the 4 × 100 metres relay, together with teammates Katja Wakan, Johanna Kedzierski and Verena Sailer.

Tschirch represented Germany at the 2008 Summer Olympics in Beijing. She competed in the 4 × 100 metres relay together with Anne Möllinger, Verena Sailer and Marion Wagner. In their first round heat they placed third behind Jamaica and Russia and in front of China. Their time of 43.59 seconds was the eighth time overall out of sixteen participating nations. With this result they qualified for the final in which they sprinted to a time of 43.28 seconds, which was the fifth place.

She competes for TSV Bayer 04 Leverkusen.

References

External links 
 

1979 births
Living people
Athletes from Dresden
People from Bezirk Dresden
German female sprinters
Olympic athletes of Germany
Athletes (track and field) at the 2008 Summer Olympics
German national athletics champions
World Athletics Championships medalists
20th-century German women
Olympic female sprinters